The 2018–19 Serie A1 is the 100th season of the Serie A1, Italy's premier Water polo league.

Team information

The following 14 clubs compete in the Serie A1 during the 2018–19 season:

Regular season

Pld - Played; W - Won; D - Drawn; L - Lost; GF - Goals for; GA - Goals against; Diff - Difference; Pts - Points.

Playoffs
The final six was held on 23–26 May 2019 at the Bruno Bianchi Swimming Stadium in Trieste.

Semi-finals

Third place

Final

Final standings

Season statistics

Top goalscorers

References

External links
 Italian Swimming Federation 
 Official website of Total Waterpolo

2018 in water polo
2019 in water polo